The migratory locust (Locusta migratoria) is the most widespread locust species, and the only species in the genus Locusta. It occurs throughout Africa, Asia, Australia and New Zealand. It used to be common in Europe but has now become rare there. Because of the vast geographic area it occupies, which comprises many different ecological zones, numerous subspecies have been described. However, not all experts agree on the validity of some of these subspecies.

Many other species of grasshopper with gregarious and possibly migratory behaviour are referred to as 'locusts' in the vernacular, including the widely distributed desert locust.

At 6.5 Gbp, the migratory locust possesses one of the largest known insect genomes.

Polyphenism
The migratory locust is polyphenic. It transitions between two main phenotypes in response to population density; the solitary phase and the gregarious phase. As the density of the population increases the locust transforms progressively from the solitary phase towards the gregarious phase with intermediate phases:

Solitaire = solitary phase → transiens congregans (intermediate form) → gregarious phase → transiens dissocians (intermediate form) → solitaire = solitary phase.

Pigmentation and size of the migratory locust vary according to its phase (gregarious or solitary form) and its age. Gregarious nymphs have a yellow to orange covering with black spots; solitary nymphs are green or brown. The gregarious adult is brownish with yellow, the latter colour becoming more intense and extensive on maturation. The solitary adult is brown with varying extent of green colour depending on the colour of the vegetation. Gregarious adults vary in size between 40 and 60 mm according to the sex; they are smaller than the solitary adults.

The phase transition may be mediated by DNA methylation in the brain. Expression of the DNA methyltrasferase gene Dnmt3 is high in the brain of the gregarious form, decreases in gregarious locusts when they are isolated, and increases in solitary locusts when they are crowded. Knock-down reduces phase-related locomotor activity. Transcriptionally, Dnmt3 is linked with phase-core transcriptional factor, hormone receptor HR3.

Neurochemistry
Increased extracellular K was found to cause membrane depolarization in muscle activating nerves by Hoyle 1953. This then in turn reduces the nerve potential, with the final result of reducing the force output of said muscle. He also found chronic cold temperatures to increase K in the haemolymph. These changes affect L. migratorias nerve states because  as with insects and animals in general  nerve cells have a high K permeability, which allows K's transmembrane distribution to determine most cellular diffusion potential. This is shaping and will continue to shape the distribution of L. migratorias range under climate change.

Relationship with humans

Economic impact

Swarms can travel 5 to 130 km or more in a day. Locust swarms can vary from less than one square kilometre to several hundred square kilometres with 40 to 80 million individuals per square kilometre. An adult locust can consume its own weight (several grams) in fresh food per day. For every million locusts, one ton of food is eaten.

In Africa, the last serious widespread plague of L. m. migratorioides occurred from 1928 to 1942. Since then, environmental transformations have made the development of swarms from the African migratory locust unlikely. Nevertheless, potential outbreaks are constantly monitored as plagues can be devastating.
The Malagasy migratory locust (L. m. capito) still regularly swarms (roughly twice every ten years). The desert locust, which is very similar to the African migratory locust, remains a major threat too.

Locust survey and control are primarily the responsibility of the Ministry of Agriculture in locust-affected countries and are operations undertaken by national locust units. The Food and Agriculture Organization (FAO) of the United Nations provides information on the general locust situation to all interested countries and gives warnings and forecasts to those countries in danger of invasion.

As food 
The migratory locust is an edible insect. In Europe, the migratory locust is officially approved for the use in food in Switzerland (since May 2017). On 2 July 2021, the European Food Safety Agency published a scientific opinion stating that the consumption of migratory locust in frozen, dried or grounded state is safe for humans. On 12 November 2021, the EU member states gave their green light for the EU Commission to authorize the placing on the market of migratory locust as a food. This is one of the final steps in the novel food authorization procedure. As a next step, the Commission will now adopt a legal act.

Subspecies of Locusta migratoria

L. migratoria is found over a vast geographic area, and its range covers many different ecological zones.  Because of this, numerous subspecies have been described; however, not all experts agree on the validity of some of these subspecies.

 L. m. burmana Ramme, 1951
 L. m. capito Saussure, 1884 (Malagasy migratory locust: Madagascar)
 L. m. cinerascens Fabricius, 1781 (Italy, Spain)
 L. m. migratoria (Linnaeus, 1758)  (europe)
 Locusta migratoria manilensis (Meyen, 1875)
 L. m. migratorioides (Fairmaire & L.J. Reiche, 1849) (African migratory locust: Africa and Atlantic islands)
 L. m. tibetensis Chen, Yonglin, 1963
 L. m. danica (Linnaeus, 1767) = L. m. migratoria (Linnaeus, 1758)
 L. m. gallica Remaudičre, 1947 =  L. m. migratoria (Linnaeus, 1758)
 L. m. solitaria Carthy, 1955 = L. m. migratoria (Linnaeus, 1758)

Other species called 'locusts' 
Other species of Orthoptera that display gregarious and migratory behaviour are called locusts. This includes:

 American locust, Schistocerca americana
 Australian plague locust, Chortoicetes terminifera
 Bombay locust, Nomadacris succincta
 Brown locust, Locustana pardalina
 Desert locust, Schistocerca gregaria
 Egyptian locust, Anacridium aegyptium
 Italian locust, Calliptamus italicus
 Moroccan locust, Dociostaurus maroccanus
 Red locust, Nomadacris septemfasciata
 Rocky Mountain locust, Melanoplus spretus – extinct
 Sahelian tree locusts, Anacridium melanorhodon
 Spur-throated locust, Austracris guttulosa (note: "spur-throated grasshoppers/locusts" may also refer to spp. in other genera)
 Sudan plague locust, Aiolopus simulatrix

The Senegalese grasshopper (Oedaleus senegalensis) also often displays locust-like behaviour in the Sahel region.

Photos

See also
 2013 Madagascar locust infestation
 Australian Plague Locust Commission (APLC)

Footnotes

References

External links 

 Food and Agriculture Organization (FAO)
 The phenomenon of phases 
 Biolib 
 Fauna Europaea 
 Genus Locusta at Orthoptera Species File on Line
 Sound recordings of Migratory Locust at BioAcoustica

Oedipodinae
Orthoptera of Africa
Orthoptera of Asia
Orthoptera of Europe
Orthoptera of Oceania
Insects of Australia
Acrididae of New Zealand
Insects described in 1758
Edible insects
Animal migration
Taxa named by Carl Linnaeus
Insect pests of millets
Monotypic Orthoptera genera